Kamenicky (Kameničtí z Kamenice, sg. Kamenický in Czech) is a Czech noble family (uradel) originating from the Margraviate of Moravia. The family has been known since the 15th century. The name derives from the family's ancestral seat Kamenice in Moravia. Original seal from the year 1571 depicting the coat of arms is deposited in the Franzens museum (Moravské zemské muzeum) in Brno. The coat of arms featuring a sloping wine tendril with two leaves and a bunch of grapes. One family branch got a majesty letter 1587 from the Holy Roman Emperor Rudolf II confirming the knighthood. In addition Kamenicky family is mentioned in the genealogist Bartholomeus Paprocký's work Diadochos published in Prague 1602.

Bibliography

References 

Moravian noble families